A presidential election was held in the Socialist Republic of Romania on 28 March 1980. 

Nicolae Ceaușescu was re-elected by the Great National Assembly as the President of Romania during its meeting of 28 March 1980; he was the only candidate.

Candidate

References

1980
1980 elections in Romania
Nicolae Ceaușescu
March 1980 events in Europe